Margaret Court  (née Smith; born 16 July 1942), also known as Margaret Smith Court, is an Australian retired former world No. 1 tennis player and a Christian minister. Considered one of the greatest tennis players of all time, her 24 major singles titles and total of 64 major titles (including 19 Grand Slam women's doubles and 21 Grand Slam mixed doubles titles) are the most in tennis history. 

Court was born in Albury, New South Wales. In 1960, aged 17, she won the first of seven consecutive Australian Open singles titles. She completed a Career Grand Slam at the age of 21 with her victory at Wimbledon in 1963. Taking a brief hiatus in 1966 and 1967, Court played as an amateur until the advent of the Open Era in 1968. She completed a Grand Slam by winning all four major singles titles in 1970, part of a record six consecutive major singles victories. She gave birth to her first child in 1972, but returned to tennis later in the year and won three Grand Slam singles titles in 1973. She took similar breaks after her second and third children were born, retiring from the game in 1977.

Court's all-surfaces (hard, clay, grass and carpet) singles career-winning percentage of 91.74 is the best of all time according to the Sporteology website. Her Open-era singles career winning percentage of 91.02% (608–60) is unequalled, as is her Open-era winning percentage of 91.67% (11–1) in Grand Slam singles finals. Her win–loss performance in all Grand Slam singles tournaments was 90.00% (207–23). She was 95.24% (60–3) at the Australian Open, 89.80% (44–5) at the French Open, 85.00% (51–9) at Wimbledon, and 89.66% (52–6) at the US Open. She also shares the Open-era record for most Grand Slam singles titles as a mother (3) with Kim Clijsters. In 1973, Court set the record for most singles titles won in a single Grand Slam event (for either women's or men's), with 11 Australian Open wins. This record was surpassed by Rafael Nadal in 2019 when he won his 12th French Open title, but it remains a women's record.

Court is one of only three players in history (all women) to have won the "Grand Slam Boxed Set", consisting of every Grand Slam title (the singles, doubles and mixed doubles). She is the only player in tennis history to complete a Multiple Grand Slam set, twice, in all three disciplines. Uniquely, she won all 12 as an amateur and then, after a period of retirement, returned as a professional to win all 12 again. Court is also one of only six tennis players to win a Multiple Grand Slam set in two disciplines, matching Roy Emerson, Martina Navratilova, Frank Sedgman, Doris Hart, and Serena Williams. She also won the Fed Cup with Australia on four occasions. The International Tennis Hall of Fame states "For sheer strength of performance and accomplishment there has never been a tennis player to match (her)." In 2010, the Herald Sun called her the greatest female tennis player of all time, a view supported by Evonne Goolagong Cawley.

Having grown up as a Roman Catholic, Court became associated with Pentecostalism in the 1970s and became a Christian minister in that tradition in 1991. She later founded Margaret Court Ministries.

Tennis career

Court was born in Albury, New South Wales, the youngest of four children of Lawrence Smith and Catherine Beaufort. She has two older brothers, Kevin and Vincent, and an older sister, June Shanahan. A natural left-hander, she was persuaded to change to a right-hand grip. She began playing tennis when she was eight years old and was 18 in 1960 when she won the first of seven consecutive singles titles at the Australian Championships.

She became the first Australian woman to win a Grand Slam tournament abroad when she won the French and US Championships in 1962. The next year, she became the first Australian woman to win Wimbledon. Across singles, doubles and mixed doubles, she has won a remarkable 64 Grand Slams.

After the tournament in Munich, Germany in August 1966, Court temporarily retired from tennis. In 1967, she married Barry Court, whose father, Charles Court, and brother, Richard Court, were premiers of Western Australia. She returned to tennis in November 1967, and in 1970 won all four Grand Slam singles titles. The next year, she lost the Wimbledon singles final to Evonne Goolagong Cawley while pregnant with her first child, Daniel, who was born in March 1972. She made a comeback that year, playing in the US Open and throughout 1973. Her second child, Marika, was born in 1974. She started playing again in November of that year. After missing most of 1976 after having her third child, she returned to the tour in early 1977 but retired permanently that year when she learned she was expecting her fourth child. Her last Grand Slam tournament singles appearance was in the 1975 US Open. Her last Grand Slam tournament appearance overall was in the 1976 Australian Open in women's doubles.

Court is one of only three players to achieve a career "boxed set" of Grand Slam titles, winning every possible Grand Slam title—singles, women's doubles and mixed doubles—at all four Grand Slam events. The others are Doris Hart and Martina Navratilova. However, Court is the only person to win all 12 Grand Slam events at least twice. She also is unique in having completed "boxed sets" both before the Open Era and after it began.

Court lost a heavily publicised and U.S.–televised challenge match to a former world No. 1 male tennis player, the 55-year-old Bobby Riggs, on 13 May 1973, in Ramona, California. Court was the top-ranked women's player at the time, and the New York Times claimed that she did not take the match seriously because it was a mere exhibition. Using a mixture of lobs and drop shots, Riggs beat her 6–2, 6–1. Four months later, Billie Jean King beat Riggs in the Battle of the Sexes match in the Houston Astrodome.

In January 2003, Show Court One at the sports and entertainment complex Melbourne Park was renamed Margaret Court Arena. Since 2012, the arena has attracted calls for its name to be changed on the basis of Court's statements against gay and lesbian rights.

Playing style, Grand Slam titles and world rankings

During the 1960s, Court was considered to have a very long reach which added a new dimension to women's volleying. With a height and reach advantage and being extremely strong, she was very formidable at the net and had an effective overhead shot. She was considered unusually mobile for her size and played an all attack, serve and volley style which, when added to her big serve, dominated conservative defensive players. Part of what helped her win was her commitment to fitness training. Court was dubbed "The Aussie Amazon" because she did weights, circuit training and running along sandy hillsides. This training helped keep her relatively injury-free through most of her career.

Court won a record 64 Grand Slam tournament titles, including a record 24 singles titles, 19 women's doubles titles and a record 21 mixed doubles titles. The total includes two shared titles at the Australian Championships/Open in 1965 and 1969. The mixed doubles finals of those years were not played because of bad weather and the titles are shared by both of the finalist pairs.

Court won 62 of the 85 Grand Slam tournament finals (72.9%) she played, including 24–5 (82.8%) in singles finals, 19–14 (57.6%) in women's doubles finals and 19–4 (82.6%) in mixed doubles finals.

Court reached the final in 29, the semifinals in 36 and the quarterfinals in 43 of the 47 Grand Slams singles tournaments she played. She won 11 of the 16 Grand Slam singles tournaments she entered, beginning with the 1969 Australian Open and ending with the 1973 US Open. She also won 11 of the 17 Grand Slam singles tournaments she entered, beginning with the 1962 Australian Championships and ending with the 1966 Australian Championships. She was 146–2 (98.6%) against unseeded players in Grand Slam singles tournaments.

Court is the only player to have won the Grand Slam in both singles and mixed doubles. She won the singles Grand Slam in 1970, the mixed doubles Grand Slam in 1963 with fellow Australian Ken Fletcher and the mixed doubles Grand Slam in 1965 with three different partners (Fletcher, John Newcombe and Fred Stolle).

Court won more than half of all the Grand Slam contests held in 1963 (8 of 12), 1964 (7 of 12), 1965 (9 of 12), 1969 (8 of 12), 1970 (7 of 11) and 1973 (6 of 11).

According to the end-of-year rankings compiled by London's Daily Telegraph from 1914 to 1972, Court was ranked world No. 1 six times: 1962, 1963, 1964, 1965, 1969 and 1970. She was also ranked No. 1 for 1973 when the official rankings were produced by the Women's Tennis Association.

Career timeline

1959 – Competed at the Australian Championships for the first time losing in the second round against eventual tournament winner Mary Reitano.
1960 – Won her first singles title at the Australian Championships, but lost the junior girls final there to Lesley Turner Bowrey.
1962 – Won three of the four Grand Slam singles tournaments.
1963 – Became the first Australian woman to win a singles title at Wimbledon. She and Ken Fletcher became the only team to win all four Grand Slam mixed-doubles titles during the same calendar year.
1964 – Won three of the four Grand Slam mixed doubles tournaments. Her women's doubles title at Wimbledon completed her career "boxed set" of Grand Slam titles.
1965 – Won three of the four Grand Slam singles tournaments and all four Grand Slam mixed-doubles titles, with three different partners.
1966 – After losing in August to Vlasta Kodesova in the quarterfinals of a tournament in Munich, Germany, Court temporarily retired.
1968 - Returned to match play in November 1967 at the New South Wales Championships. She resumed playing a full schedule in 1968, where at the beginning of the season, she lost to Billie Jean King in the finals of the Western Australia Championships and the Australian National Championships.
1969 – Won three of the four Grand Slam singles and mixed doubles tournaments.
1970 – Won all four Grand Slam singles tournaments, defeating Kerry Melville Reid in the Australian Open final, Helga Niessen Masthoff in the French Open final, Billie Jean King in the Wimbledon final, and Rosemary Casals in the US Open final. Maureen Connolly in 1953 and Steffi Graf in 1988 are the only other women who have won all four Grand Slam singles tournaments during the same calendar year.
1971 – Won the Australian Championship for the 10th time. After losing in mid-July to Billie Jean King in the semifinals of a tournament in West Kirby, England, Court left the tour to prepare for the March 1972 birth of her first child.
1972 – Returned to the tour in late July. Lost to Billie Jean King in the semifinals of the US Open.
1973 – Won three of the four Grand Slam singles and women's doubles tournaments. Became the first mother in the Open Era to win the Australian, French, and US Open championships. Lost her match with Bobby Riggs. Her women's doubles title at the US Open completed a "boxed set" of Grand Slam titles won exclusively after the start of the Open Era in 1968.
1974 – Absent from the game until November because of the birth of her second child. Won the Western Australian Championships on her playing return and reached the final of the New South Wales Championships the following week.
1975 – Played the final Grand Slam singles match of her career, losing to Martina Navratilova in a quarterfinal of the US Open 6–2, 6–4. At her final Australian championships (played in December 1974), she suffered only her second defeat in the singles prior to the final in all her appearances at the event, losing to Navratilova in a quarterfinal. Having won the mixed doubles at her last Wimbledon (partnering Marty Riessen), she partnered with Virginia Wade at the US Open to win her 62nd Grand Slam title and 19th Grand Slam women's doubles title, defeating King and Casals in the final. This was Court's last Grand Slam title. Her last tournament of the year was in late September in Tokyo where she won the title.
1976 – Court was absent from the game until late September due to the birth of her third child. Tokyo was her first tournament after returning to the tour, where she lost the final to Betty Stöve. She finished the year by defeating Sue Barker in the singles final in Melbourne, Australia
1977 – Played the final singles match of her career, defeating Greer Stevens in the third round of the Virginia Slims Championships of Detroit 5–7, 7–6, 6–3. Court defaulted the quarterfinal to Françoise Dürr upon learning that she was pregnant with her fourth child.

Honours
On 1 January 1967, she was made Member of the Order of the British Empire (MBE), for her services to sport and international relations.
In 1963 and 1970, she became winner of the ABC Sportsman of the Year Award.
In 1970 she also won a Western Australian honour, the Walter Lindrum Award.
In 1979, Court was inducted into the International Tennis Hall of Fame.
In 1985, Court was inducted into the Sport Australia Hall of Fame and then elevated to Legend status in 1998.
In 1993 in Melbourne, she was inducted into the Australian Tennis Hall of Fame.
In 2000, Court was awarded the Australian Sports Medal for her impressive tennis career.
In 2001, she was awarded the Centenary Medal for her service to Australian tennis.
In 2001, she was inducted onto the Victorian Honour Roll of Women.
In 2003 Court became the recipient of the 2003 Australia Post Australian Legends Award. Australia Post honoured her, together with fellow Australian tennis player Rod Laver by featuring her on postage stamp.
In 2006, she was awarded the International Tennis Federation's (ITF) accolade, the Philippe Chatrier Award.
In 2007, she was made an Officer of the Order of Australia (AO), for her services to tennis, as a mentor and to the community.
In 2021, she was advanced to a Companion of the Order of Australia (AC), for "eminent service to tennis as an internationally acclaimed player and record-holding grand slam champion, and as a mentor of young sportspersons".

Ministry 
Court was raised as a Roman Catholic but became involved with Pentecostalism in the mid-1970s. In 1983, she gained a theological qualification from the Rhema Bible Training Centre, and in 1991 was ordained as an independent Pentecostal minister and so speaks publicly about her faith. She subsequently founded a ministry known as Margaret Court Ministries. In 1995, she founded a Pentecostal church known as the Victory Life Centre in Perth. She still serves as its senior pastor. Her television show, A Life of Victory, airs on Sundays on the Australian Christian Channel and locally in Perth on community television station West TV. She has generally embraced teachings associated with the Word of Faith movement and teaches her view of biblical doctrine.

In 1997, Court established Victory Life Community Services, later rebranded as Margaret Court Community Outreach (MCCO). In 2014 it was described by The West Australian as "one of WA's biggest stand-alone food charities", supplying around 25 tonnes of food each week.

Since 2010, she has been the president of Victory Life International, a network of like-minded churches, and is a long-standing patron of the Australian Family Association and Drug Free Australia.

Controversy 
Court has been a consistent critic of same-sex marriage in Australia. In 2012, she opposed proposed same-sex marriage reforms. Court has been criticised for such statements by openly gay tennis players Billie Jean King, Rennae Stubbs and Martina Navratilova, and in 2012, an LGBT rights protest group called for the renaming of Margaret Court Arena.

Court was criticised in May 2017 after writing a letter to The West Australian decrying Qantas, the largest airline in Australia, for being a corporate supporter of same-sex marriage and saying that she would boycott the airline. The letter, and further follow-up interviews, again led to calls from some Australians and tennis players to rename the Margaret Court Arena. Some politicians, including Prime Minister Malcolm Turnbull, rejected calls for the change of name, saying the name celebrates Margaret Court as a tennis player. Writing in the wake of this incident, Russell Jackson noted that Court had always held controversial views, which he described as "stubbornly immovable", citing her support for apartheid in 1970 ("South Africans have this thing better organised than any other country, particularly America") and her criticisms of Navratilova in 1990 ("a great player but I'd like someone at the top who the younger players can look up to. It's very sad for children to be exposed to homosexuality") as examples. He added that this and the similar incident from 2012 are calculated provocations, allowing Court to portray herself as the victim and use the publicity to her advantage, and show that "for better or worse, Court is now the principal architect of her own image".

On 23 January 2019, Anna Wintour, in her keynote address for the Australian Open's Inspirational Series, renewed calls for the arena's renaming. Court responded by saying she was "disappointed" that someone "coming from America" was "unable to tolerate views that were not in line with her own" and "[is] telling us in this nation what to do". Later in the year, Court called on Tennis Australia to honour her and the 50th anniversary of her 1970 Grand Slam in the same way as it honoured Rod Laver earlier in 2019, arguing that the organisation should disregard her views on same-sex marriage, as her tennis achievements are from "a different phase of my life from where I am now and if we are not big enough as a nation and a game to face those challenges there is something wrong." Tennis Australia issued a statement that it "recognises the tennis achievements of Margaret Court, although her views do not align with our values of equality, diversity and inclusion" and asserted that it is "in the process of working through" how Court's milestone might be included at the 2020 Australian Open. During the tournament, however, high-profile guests Martina Navratilova and John McEnroe paraded a banner calling for the Margaret Court Arena to be renamed in honour of four-time Australian Open champion Evonne Goolagong.

In 2020, her Margaret Court Community Outreach charity was denied a Lotterywest grant for a freezer truck on the basis of her public statements on gay people. She subsequently announced she would lodge a complaint with the Equal Opportunity Commission of Western Australia.

Portrayal in film
Jacqueline McKenzie portrayed Court in the 2001 TV movie When Billie Beat Bobby.

Jessica McNamee portrayed Court in the 2017 Hollywood film Battle of the Sexes.

Grand Slam tournament performance timelines

Singles

Women's doubles

Grand Slam singles finals: 29 finals (24 titles, 5 runner-ups)

Records
 Records in bold indicate peer-less achievements.

All-time Grand Slam records
 These are women's standing records for all-time period in tennis history.

Grand Slam records per tournament

Career tournament records

See also

 List of female tennis players
 List of Grand Slam related tennis records
 List of tennis rivalries
 List of tennis tournaments
 List of WTA number 1 ranked players
 Tennis records of the Open Era – Women's singles
 World number 1 women tennis players from 1883–present
 Performance timelines for all female tennis players who reached at least one Grand Slam final
 WTA Tour records

References

External links

 
 
 
 
 
 
 She's Game: Women Making Australian Sporting History - Margaret Court from the Australian Women's Archives Project
 
 
 Reverend Margaret Court AO, MBE at Victory Life Centre

1942 births
Living people
Australian anti-same-sex-marriage activists
Australian female tennis players
Australian Championships (tennis) champions
Australian Open (tennis) champions
Australian Pentecostal pastors
Companions of the Order of Australia
Converts to Pentecostal denominations
Converts to evangelical Christianity from Roman Catholicism
Women Christian clergy
French Championships (tennis) champions
French Open champions
International Tennis Hall of Fame inductees
Australian Members of the Order of the British Empire
Sportspeople from Albury
Recipients of the Australian Sports Medal
Recipients of the Centenary Medal
Sport Australia Hall of Fame inductees
Sportswomen from New South Wales
Sportswomen from Western Australia
Tennis people from New South Wales
United States National champions (tennis)
US Open (tennis) champions
Western Australian Sports Star of the Year winners
Wimbledon champions
Wimbledon champions (pre-Open Era)
Grand Slam (tennis) champions in women's singles
Grand Slam (tennis) champions in women's doubles
Grand Slam (tennis) champions in mixed doubles
Tennis players from Perth, Western Australia
World number 1 ranked female tennis players